Ajim Khan is a town in the Federally Administered Tribal Areas of Pakistan. It is located at 32°25'39N 69°28'13E with an altitude of 1814 metres (5954 feet).

References

Populated places in Khyber Pakhtunkhwa